Edwin James Jorden (August 30, 1863 – September 7, 1903) was a Republican member of the U.S. House of Representatives from Pennsylvania.

Biography
Edwin J. Jorden was born in Spring Hill, near Towanda, Pennsylvania.  He attended the common schools and Keystone Academy.  He graduated from the State Normal School at Mansfield, Pennsylvania.  He studied law, was admitted to the bar in 1888 and commenced practice in Tunkhannock, Pennsylvania.

Jorden was elected as a Republican to the Fifty-third Congress to fill the vacancy caused by the death of Myron B. Wright and served from February 23 until March 4, 1895 (10 days).  He was not a candidate for renomination in 1894.  He resumed the practice of his profession and died in Tunkhannock in 1903.  Interment in Sunnyside Cemetery.

Sources

The Political Graveyard

Pennsylvania lawyers
1863 births
1903 deaths
Mansfield University of Pennsylvania alumni
Republican Party members of the United States House of Representatives from Pennsylvania
19th-century American politicians